Rocco "Rocky" Gattellari (born 6 September 1941) is an Italian-Australian former boxer, Olympian, political candidate and businessman. Rocky was the 2010 Inductee for the Australian National Boxing Hall of Fame Veterans category.

Olympic Games
Gattellari was selected in the Australian team for the 1960 Summer Olympics in Rome, Italy. He defeated Abdelkader Belghiti from Morocco before losing to eventual gold medalist Gyula Török from Hungary.

Professional career
Gattellari made his professional debut on 18 September 1961. On 26 February 1962 he won the Australian flyweight championship title, which he defended twice.

On 2 December 1965 he contested the world flyweight title, losing to Salvatore Burruni in the 13th round. On 11 December 1967 Gattellari fought Lionel Rose for the Australian bantamweight title, losing by a knockout in the 13th round. He retired in 1968.

Gattellari made a comeback in 1979, fighting Paul Ferreri for the Australian featherweight title. He lost by a TKO in the 3rd round.

Gattellari retired with a professional record of 21 wins (12 by knockout), three losses (all knockouts) and one draw.

Retirement
Upon retirement Gattellari became a restaurateur, opening Berowra Waters Inn and then Rocky's at Edgecliff. He went on to become a finance broker.

Gattellari contested the 1995 New South Wales state election as a Liberal candidate for Cabramatta. He was defeated by Labor incumbent Reba Meagher who sought an apprehended violence order against him.

Autobiography

References

External links

1941 births
Living people
Sportspeople from the Metropolitan City of Reggio Calabria
Olympic boxers of Australia
Flyweight boxers
Boxers at the 1960 Summer Olympics
Italian emigrants to Australia
Australian male boxers
Australian people of Calabrian descent